Aweer may refer to:
the Aweer people
the Aweer language
Al Aweer, a town in Dubai